is a multi-use stadium in Hakodate, Hokkaido, Japan. It holds 15,000 people. It is mostly used for track and field competitions as well as football games.

The stadium was completely renovated in 2001, and since then has also been used by the J.League team Hokkaido Consadole Sapporo.

References

External links
 
 Stadium pictures

Hokkaido Consadole Sapporo
Football venues in Japan
Sports venues in Hokkaido
Athletics (track and field) venues in Japan
Buildings and structures in Hakodate